Maria Nelly Padilha Amaral (born 6 November 1937) is a Brazilian former sports shooter. She competed in two events at the 1988 Summer Olympics.

References

External links
 

1937 births
Living people
Brazilian female sport shooters
Olympic shooters of Brazil
Shooters at the 1988 Summer Olympics
Pan American Games medalists in shooting
Pan American Games bronze medalists for Brazil
Shooters at the 1987 Pan American Games
20th-century Brazilian women
21st-century Brazilian women